Noordburen is a hamlet in the Dutch province of North Holland. It is a part of the municipality of Hollands Kroon. Noordburen lies about 14 km southeast of Den Helder, and one km north of Hippolytushoef.

Noordburen is not a statistical entity, and the postal authorities have placed it under Hippolytushoef. Noordburen has place name signs, and consists of a handful of houses.

References

Populated places in North Holland
Hollands Kroon